Esch-sur-Alzette (or Esch an der Alzig) is a city in the Grand Duchy of Luxembourg and the country's second-most populous commune, with a population of 35,040 inhabitants, . It lies in the south-west of the country, on the border with France and in the valley of the Alzette, which flows through the city. The city is usually referred to as just Esch; however, the full name distinguishes it from the village and commune of Esch-sur-Sûre which lies  further north. Esch was selected as the European Capital of Culture for 2022, alongside Kaunas and Novi Sad.

History
The town was mentioned for the first time in 12 April  1128 in a message for Pope Honorius II.
For a long time Esch was a small farming village in the valley of the Uelzecht river. This changed when important amounts of iron ore were found in the area in the 1850s. With the development of the mines and the steel industry the town's population multiplied tenfold in a couple of decades. In 1911 the steel- and iron-producing company ARBED was founded. The development of the steel industry, especially in the south of the country, provided Luxembourg with sustained economic growth during the second half of the 19th century.

In the 1970s, as a result of the steel crisis, the mines and many of the blast furnaces were shut down, the last one, in Esch-Belval, definitively halting its operations in 1997. The blast furnaces were replaced by an electric furnace that is fed with scrap metal rather than iron ore.

Today the industrial wastelands on Belval left behind by the steel industry, are being redeveloped and converted into a new, modern town quarter. New cultural buildings such as the cinema Kinepolis Belval and the Rockhal, Luxembourg's biggest concert hall.

The area around the old blast furnaces will host different structures of the University of Luxembourg, many research centres and the national archives.

Places of interest

The Lankelz miniature railway operates on Sunday afternoons and public holidays from May to mid-October.

Esch is home to the Conservatoire de Musique.

The city has the longest shopping street in Luxembourg.

Population

Government and politics

Local

Esch is governed by its communal council, consisting of 19 councillors. Elections take place to this body every 6 years, under a system of proportional representation. Currently the mayor is Vera Spautz, of the Luxembourg Socialist Workers' Party (LSAP). The governing majority on the council consists of the LSAP and The Greens.

'G' denotes parties that went on to form the governing majority.

 2017 elections
The most recent elections were held on 8 October 2017; the results are listed below.

After the elections, a coalition agreement was signed between 3 parties, the CSV, the Greens, and the DP, who will form the new governing majority on the council. The designated new mayor is Tom Schlesser of Dei Lénk.

Culture

Film production

In 2001, a Luxembourg film production company had depicted a 40,000 m2 and 15 meter high backdrop built for the feature film Secret Passage with John Turturro on the Terre Rouge, a site of a former steelwork in Esch-sur Alzette. The filmset represents the contemporary Venice of the 16th century with a 600 meter long copy of the Grand Canal and 118 house facades. The "Venice-sur-Alzette" was built for around 5 million Euro and was one of the largest open-air film sets in European film history. 

Between 2001 and 2007 many film productions used the gigantic filmset. Among others the feature films The Merchant of Venice with Al Pacino and The Girl with the Pearl Earring with Scarlett Johansson were shot in Esch.  In the summer of 2007, the filmset was torn down because the weather was affecting the buildings.

European Capital of Culture for 2022
The city of Esch-sur-Alzette was selected as the European Capital of Culture for 2022, alongside Kaunas and Novi Sad.

Notable people
 

Jean Ellis (1946–2006), emergency department physician and climber
Karin Monschauer (born 1960), embroiderer and digital artist
Maggy Stein (1931–1999), sculptor

Transport

Esch is connected by the bus lines 1,2,3,4,5,7,12,13,15 and 17 of the communal public transport company T.I.C.E (tramways intercommunales du canton Esch/Alzette, intercommunal tramway of the canton Esch/Alzette), which maintenance depot and headquarter is situated in Esch, and by lines 307, 312, 313 and 314 of the R.G.T.R.

Twin towns — sister cities

Esch-sur-Alzette is twinned with:

  Coimbra, Portugal
  Cologne, Germany
  Liège, Belgium
  Lille, France
  Mödling, Austria
  Offenbach am Main, Germany
  Puteaux, France
  Rotterdam, Netherlands
  Turin, Italy
  Velletri, Italy
  Zemun, Serbia
  Stryi, Ukraine

References

External links

  Official website of the town of Esch-sur-Alzette
 A large private collection of pictures of the town and its surroundings — articles in German, French and Luxembourgish
 HoloGuides : Esch/Alzette - photos, events, etc.
 FEATS Newsletter, December 1999 - discusses quite a few matters relating to Esch

 
Alzette
Cities in Luxembourg
Communes in Esch-sur-Alzette (canton)
Towns in Luxembourg